Sergei Aleksandrovich Pesyakov (born 16 December 1988) is a Russian football goalkeeper who plays for FC Rostov.

Career

Club
Pesyakov made his professional debut for FC Spartak Moscow on 13 July 2010 in the Russian Cup game against FC Metallurg Lipetsk. He played in all Spartak Moscow's 2012–13 UEFA Champions League matches, conceding Kris Commons's penalty in the 2-1 loss against Celtic at Parkhead.

Pesyakov moved on a season-long loan to Anzhi Makhachkala on 12 August 2015. Anzhi terminated the loan early on 29 December 2015.

On 9 June 2017, he signed a 2-year contract with FC Rostov.

International
Pesyakov was a part of the Russia U-21 side that was competing in the 2011 European Under-21 Championship qualification.

He was first called up to Russia national football team for UEFA Euro 2020 qualifying matches against San Marino and Cyprus in June 2019. He made his debut in a friendly against Tajikistan on 17 November 2022.

Career statistics

Club

International

References

External links
 
 

1988 births
Sportspeople from Ivanovo
Living people
Russian footballers
Russia youth international footballers
Russia under-21 international footballers
Russia national football B team footballers
Russia international footballers
Association football goalkeepers
FC Shinnik Yaroslavl players
FC Tekstilshchik Ivanovo players
FC Spartak Moscow players
FC Tom Tomsk players
FC Rostov players
FC Spartak-2 Moscow players
FC Anzhi Makhachkala players
Russian Premier League players
Russian First League players
Russian Second League players